Side Tracks is a compilation album by Steve Earle. The album was released in 2002.

Track listing
All songs written by Steve Earle unless otherwise noted.
"Some Dreams" - 3:04
"Open Your Window" - 3:51
"Me and the Eagle" - 4:55
"Johnny Too Bad" - 4:09 (Winston Bailey, Roy Beckford, Derrick Leapold Crooks, Delroy George Wilson)
"Dominick St." - 3:10 (Steve Earle, Sharon Shannon)
"Breed" - 2:44 (Kurt Cobain)
"Time Has Come Today" - 4:16 (Joseph Chambers, Willie Chambers)
"Ellis Unit One" - 4:40
"Creepy Jackalope Eye" - 3:05 (Ed Daly, Dan Bolton, Dan Siegal, Ron Heathman (Supersuckers))
"Willin'" - 4:04 (Lowell George)
"Sara's Angel" - 3:02
"My Uncle" - 3:29 (Chris Hillman, Gram Parsons)
"My Back Pages" - 4:08 (Bob Dylan)

Chart performance

References

Steve Earle compilation albums
2002 compilation albums
Artemis Records compilation albums